Vambola Põder (born 6 August 1929 in Tartu – 12 March 1993 Tallinn) is an Estonian journalist and politician. He was a member of VII Riigikogu.

References

1929 births
1993 deaths
Estonian journalists
Members of the Riigikogu, 1992–1995
Hugo Treffner Gymnasium alumni
University of Tartu alumni
People from Tartu
Politicians from Tartu
Burials at Pärnamäe Cemetery